Jane Caminos (born 1947) is an American-born queer cartoonist and artist. During her college career, she became involved in activism, leading her to create paintings inspired by causes that are important to her, such as the Vietnam War and violence against women.

Personal life 
She was born in 1947 in Brooklyn, New York. She was raised as an only child in Pompton Lakes, New Jersey where she attended high school. Beginning at a young age, she dreamed of becoming a Radio City Rockette and was always creative. At five years old, she would use the walls of her parent's home as her canvas with crayons and brushes being her tools of choice. She is fluent in both English and Spanish.

In 1969, she graduated from the Rhode Island School of Design. She has always preferred to create funny drawings over realistic ones and originally she hoped to work for Walt Disney World as an artist. During her college years, she developed her own political beliefs. She graduated BFA from Rhode Island School of Design in 1969 and began her career as an illustrator and designer. In the 1970s, she worked as an art director for books, novelties, and periodicals but also did freelance work as an illustrator. She moved to New York City in 1991 and brought her studio, Illustratus, with her. Here is where she would go on to create her famous cartoon, That's Ms. Bulldyke to You, Charlie! In her book, Caminos uses humor and wit to share the joys of womanhood as she encourages readers to explore what this means. Common themes throughout her book are of loving women, dating, relationships, sex, body image, coming out, acceptance, culture, and politics. Throughout her book, Caminos uses an informal style to share the experience of being a woman in every capacity.

In 2016, she moved to Seattle, Washington where she continues to live today. She continues to cultivate her work as both an activist and an artist by making connections and creating more artworks. In 2018, she became associated with Fogue Studio & Gallery, a studio for established artists over the age of fifty. She has continued to create many solo and group exhibitions across the United States including Chicago, New York City, New Jersey, and California. She now has an online-only show as a result of the COVID-19 pandemic.

She currently works from her Shoreline, WA art studio.

To unwind, Jane loves to listen to live music, sit by the Hudson River, dream of being in Maine, meditate, and fall asleep listening to recordings of thunderstorms. Along with painting, she also considers hosting dinner parties, music, shopping for shoes and dishes, gardening, sewing, and building furniture as some of her hobbies.

Career 
After graduating college, she founded her design studio, Illustratus in Newton, Massachusetts. Her first job was as an art editor and illustrator for Ginn & Company, located in the Boston area. She worked there from 1976 to 1980. In 1979, she began working as an art production manager for Intentional Educations. She worked there for three years. After leaving her job, she started working for Xerox as an operations and production manager. She also worked as an art director for Houghton Mifflin Harcourt in 1981 for six years.

She worked as a creative director for The Success Group from 1988 to 2008.

In 1993, she worked as an art editor and illustrator for Bill Smith Group in NYC until leaving her job in 1999.

She currently works as an independent narrative oil painter and illustrator.

Political activism 
During her college years, she developed her own political beliefs. Her works were largely inspired by the Vietnam War and violence against women. In an interview, Caminos explains how the war crushed many people's dream in the 60s, causing her to take action in her activism by participating in protests and creating works like “Grenade” and “Fear." This led her to begin creating feminist works that would shape her career as an artist.

According to the website, Artsy Shark, Caminos' paintings, with their vivid coloring and patterns, show the acts of violence that are carried out against women across the world. In these pieces, she began to use more bright colors and patterns that were reflective of Matisse, Gaugin, and Andy Warhol. Her formative influences were Thurber and Don Martin in MAD. Through her works, she has wanted to start conversations about gender based crime and build awareness that these crimes happen everywhere every day.

Works 
-That's Ms Bulldyke To You, Charlie!

-"What Is This Thing Called Sex?: Cartoons By Women" was published in 1993. Jane's work was published along fellow queer cartoonists- Alison Bechdel, Suzy Becker, Barbara Brandon, Claire Bretcher, Martha Campbell, Jennifer Camper, Gaynor Cardew, Margie Cherry, Fernanda Core, Rhonda Dicksion, Patrizia deAmbrogio, Diane DiMassa, Wendy Eastwood, Jan Eliot, Nicole Ferentz, FISH, Shary Flenniken, Ellen Forney, Leanne Franson, Catherine Goggia, Roberta Gregory, Marion Henley, Nicole Hollander, Judy Horacek, Cath Jackson, Lynn Johnston, Lee Kennedy, Kris Kovic, Kathryn LeMieux, Shan Leslie, Maggie Ling, Maureen Lister, Gail Machlis, Giulinia Maldini, Theresa McCracken, Amy Meredith, Andrea Natalie, Barbary O'Brien, Joann Palanker, Nina Paley, Rina Piccolo, Stephanie Piro, Julia Posar, Viv Quillin, Jacki Randall, Libby Reid, Dianne Reum, Christine Roche, Ursula Roma, Flash Rosenberg, Sharon Rudahl, Mary Sativa, Theresa Henry Smith, Noreen Stevens, Chris Suddick, Linda Sue Welch, and Signe Wilkinson.

-In 1995, she was featured in Dyke Strippers: Lesbian Cartoonists A to Z by Roz Warren. She was featured alongside other notable cartoonists such as Alison Bechdel, Roberta Gregory, and dozens more. The collection follows cartoon strips and panels about women's experience with sex and relationships in the 90s.

-Several of Caminos' periodicals include Christopher Street, Gaze Magazine (Minneapolis), Lesbians in Colorado, and Network Magazine along with an additional collection, The Best Contemporary Women's Humor.

Paintings 
Caminos primarily paints a variety of women who show different personalities and styles. She uses a mixture of seriousness and humor to share difficult topics with viewers. She has expressed her passion for sharing the stories of women regardless of age, race, or nationality.

On Women Bound 
On Women Bound is Caminos' most recent project. In 2012, after watching a PBS documentary on the violence against women and the lack of freedom many endure, she was deeply moved. She decided to use her voice as protest against the atrocities women face in the world, leading her to create her famous exhibition, On Women Bound. The exhibition contains a collection of her pieces that explore the lives of all women.

She is currently working on her newest series, On Women Unbound, which will celebrate the daily victories of women.

Nominations 

In 1992, her book, That's Ms. Bulldyke to You, Charlie!, was nominated as a finalist for the humor category in the 5th Lambda Literary Awards.

References 

1947 births
Living people
American cartoonists
Rhode Island School of Design alumni